Admiral Sir Derek Roy Reffell,  (born 6 October 1928) is a former Royal Navy officer and Governor of Gibraltar.

Naval career
Educated at Culford School, Reffell entered the Royal Navy, qualified as a Navigating Officer in 1954 and progressed through the ranks: he commanded the frigate  from her launch in 1966, and served as captain of the commando carrier  from 1974 to 1976 and as Commodore, Amphibious Warfare, from 1978 to 1979.  He was appointed Assistant Chief of the Naval Staff for Policy – ACNS(P) – in 1979. He was promoted to Vice-Admiral, becoming Flag Officer, Third Flotilla (FOF3) in 1982.

During the Falklands War Admiral Reffell was serving as Flag Officer Third Flotilla in charge of the amphibious ships and aircraft carriers. Alastair Finlan commented that Admiral Reffell was the obvious choice for in-theatre commander but was not selected. Commodore Michael Clapp later expressed his surprise at this decision, and, what was more, the fact that Reffell was barred access to the Northwood Headquarters so that his advice was not available. He did however become senior officer in-theatre (aboard Bristol for a period) from 1 July 1982 after Rear Admiral Sandy Woodward had returned home.

He became Controller of the Navy in 1984 and was Governor of Gibraltar 1989–1993.

References

|-

1928 births
Knights Commander of the Order of the Bath
Royal Navy admirals
People educated at Culford School
Living people
Governors of Gibraltar